Alicja Ratajczak (born 25 June 1995) is a Polish professional racing cyclist. She rode in the women's road race at the 2016 UCI Road World Championships, but she did not finish the race.

References

External links
 

1995 births
Living people
Polish female cyclists
Place of birth missing (living people)